Northampton Township is the name of two places in the U.S. state of Pennsylvania:

Northampton Township, Bucks County, Pennsylvania
Northampton Township, Somerset County, Pennsylvania

See also 
 Northampton, Pennsylvania, a borough in  Northampton County
 Northampton (disambiguation)

Pennsylvania township disambiguation pages